The 2013–14 ISU Short Track Speed Skating World Cup was a multi-race tournament over a season for short track speed skating. The season began on 28 September 2013 and ended on 17 November 2013. The World Cup was organised by the ISU who also run world cups and championships in speed skating and figure skating. The 3rd and 4th legs of the world cup, held in Turin and Kolomna, acted as qualifying events for the 2014 Winter Olympics.

The World Cup consisted of just four competitions this year (rather than six) due to the 2014 Winter Olympics in Sochi.

Calendar

Men

Shanghai

Seoul

Turin

Kolomna

Women

Shanghai

Seoul

Turin

Kolomna

World Cup standings
* Note – Standings are calculated on the best 3 out of 4 results for the individual distances

See also
2014 World Short Track Speed Skating Championships

References

External links 
 ISU.org World Cup Schedule
 Statistics and current World Cup Standings

2013-14
Isu Short Track Speed Skating World Cup, 2013-14
Isu Short Track Speed Skating World Cup, 2013-14